Neopalaemon is a genus of shrimps belonging to the family Palaemonidae.

The species of this genus are found in Central America.

Species:
 Neopalaemon nahuatlus Hobbs, 1973

References

Palaemonidae
Taxa named by Horton H. Hobbs Jr.